The Arizona City Independent is a weekly newspaper in Arizona City, Arizona, United States. It is owned by Casa Grande Valley Newspapers Inc.

References

External links
 Official website

Newspapers published in Arizona
Biweekly newspapers published in the United States